Eypak Rural District is in the Central District of Eshtehard County, Alborz province, Iran. At the most recent census of 2016, it had a population of 1,854 in 519 households. The largest of its 13 villages was Eypak, with 781 people.

References 

Eshtehard County

Rural Districts of Alborz Province

Populated places in Alborz Province

Populated places in Eshtehard County